Xuân Hồng (Tây Ninh, 1928–1996) was a Vietnamese songwriter and singer. He was a recipient of the Hồ Chí Minh Prize posthumously in 2000.

References 

People from Tây Ninh province
Vietnamese composers
1928 births
1996 deaths
Ho Chi Minh Prize recipients
20th-century composers